Terry O'Donnell may refer to:
 Terry O'Donnell (footballer), English footballer and manager
 Terry O'Donnell (politician), American politician in the Oklahoma House of Representatives

See also
 Terence O'Donnell, American writer
 Terrence O'Donnell, associate justice of the Supreme Court of Ohio